The 1958–59 Iowa State Cyclones men's basketball team represented Iowa State University during the 1958-59 NCAA University Division men's basketball season. The Cyclones were coached by Bill Strannigan, who was in his fifth and final season with the Cyclones. They played their home games at the Iowa State Armory in Ames, Iowa.

They finished the season 9–16, 4–10 in Big Eight play to finish in seventh place.

Roster

Schedule and results 

|-
!colspan=6 style=""|Regular Season

|-

References 

Iowa State Cyclones men's basketball seasons
Iowa State
Iowa State Cyc
Iowa State Cyc